Lieutenant-General Henry Andrew Sarel  (1 November 1823 – 2 January 1887) was a British Army officer who became Lieutenant Governor of Guernsey.

Military career
Educated at Rugby School, Sarel became a cornet with the 9th Queen's Royal Lancers in 1847 and subsequently transferred to the 17th Lancers. He fought with his Regiment during the Indian Mutiny in 1857 and then joined the China Expedition in 1861. He was appointed Lieutenant Governor of Guernsey in 1883 and lived at Rollesby Hall in Norfolk.

Family
He married Phyllis Molyneux.

References

1823 births
1887 deaths
British Army generals
Companions of the Order of the Bath
People educated at Rugby School
British military personnel of the Indian Rebellion of 1857
9th Queen's Royal Lancers officers
17th Lancers officers
British Army personnel of the Second Opium War